Pseudotaphoxenus is a genus of ground beetles in the family Carabidae. There are more than 110 described species in Pseudotaphoxenus, found in temperate Asia.

Pseudotaphoxenus species
These 113 species are members of the genus Pseudotaphoxenus:

 P. abnormalis   (Kyrgyzstan)
 P. achillei   (China)
 P. acutithorax   (Kazakhstan)
 P. afghanus   (Afghanistan)
 P. angusticollis   (Kazakhstan, Russia, and Ukraine)
 P. aralensis   (Kazakhstan)
 P. balkhanicus   (Turkmenistan)
 P. basilewskyi   (Afghanistan and Turkmenistan)
 P. benesi   (China)
 P. blumenthali   (Afghanistan)
 P. brevipennis   (China)
 P. brucei   (China)
 P. cavazzutii   (China)
 P. cavicollis   (China)
 P. chevrieri   (China)
 P. chinensis   (China)
 P. collaris   (Kyrgyzstan)
 P. csikii   (Mongolia)
 P. dauricus   (Kazakhstan, Mongolia, and Russia)
 P. dignus   (Kyrgyzstan, Tadzhikistan, and Uzbekistan)
 P. dissors   (Tadzhikistan)
 P. dostali   (Kazakhstan and Kyrgyzstan)
 P. elegantulus   (China)
 P. fassatii   (Kazakhstan and Kyrgyzstan)
 P. ferghanensis   (Kazakhstan, Kyrgyzstan, Tadzhikistan, and Uzbekistan)
 P. gansuensis   (China)
 P. ghilarovi   (Kazakhstan)
 P. giorgiofiorii   (Afghanistan, Iran, and Turkmenistan)
 P. gracilicornis   (China)
 P. gracilis   (Kazakhstan, Turkmenistan, and Uzbekistan)
 P. gracillimus   (Tadzhikistan)
 P. gussakovskii   (Tadzhikistan)
 P. haslundi   (Afghanistan)
 P. hauseri   (China)
 P. hindukushi   (Afghanistan)
 P. horvathi   (Russia)
 P. humeralis   (Turkmenistan)
 P. igori   (Kazakhstan)
 P. jureceki   (China, Kazakhstan, and Kyrgyzstan)
 P. juvencus   (Kyrgyzstan, Tadzhikistan, and Uzbekistan)
 P. kabakovi   (Afghanistan)
 P. kalganus   (China)
 P. kansuensis   (China)
 P. kaszabianus   (Kazakhstan and Kyrgyzstan)
 P. kavani   (Tadzhikistan)
 P. kazakhstanicus   (Kazakhstan)
 P. khan   (China)
 P. kopetdaghi   (Turkmenistan)
 P. kraatzi   (Tadzhikistan and Uzbekistan)
 P. kryzhanovskiji   (China)
 P. kuljabensis   (Tadzhikistan)
 P. kulti   (Kyrgyzstan)
 P. kurdaiensis   (Kazakhstan)
 P. lanzhouensis   (China)
 P. licenti   (China)
 P. lutshniki   (Kazakhstan)
 P. marani   (Kazakhstan)
 P. mazenderanus   (Iran)
 P. medvedevi   (Tadzhikistan)
 P. mentitus   (Kazakhstan)
 P. meurguesae   (Afghanistan)
 P. michajlovi   (Uzbekistan)
 P. mihoki   (China)
 P. minimus   (China and Kyrgyzstan)
 P. mongolicus   (China and Mongolia)
 P. niger   (China)
 P. nitidicollis   (China)
 P. obenbergeri   (Tadzhikistan)
 P. occultus   (Kazakhstan and Kyrgyzstan)
 P. oopterus   (China)
 P. optatus   (China)
 P. originalis   (Mongolia)
 P. oruzganensis   (Afghanistan)
 P. ovalis   (Kazakhstan and Kyrgyzstan)
 P. ovipennis   (Afghanistan)
 P. paropamisicus   (Afghanistan)
 P. parvulus   (China, Kazakhstan, Kyrgyzstan, and Uzbekistan)
 P. planicollis   (Kyrgyzstan and Mongolia)
 P. plutschewskyi   (Tadzhikistan)
 P. pongraczi   (Kazakhstan and Kyrgyzstan)
 P. povolnyi   (Afghanistan)
 P. pseudocollaris   (Kazakhstan and Kyrgyzstan)
 P. punctibasis   (Uzbekistan)
 P. putshkovi   (Kyrgyzstan)
 P. reichardti   (China, Tadzhikistan, and Uzbekistan)
 P. robustus   (China)
 P. rufitarsis   (Georgia, Moldova, and Russia)
 P. rugipennis   (China, Mongolia, and Russia)
 P. schaufussi   (Mongolia)
 P. semiopacus   (China)
 P. similis   (Kyrgyzstan)
 P. sinicus   (China)
 P. staudingeri   (China)
 P. sterbai   (Kyrgyzstan)
 P. stricticollis   (Tadzhikistan)
 P. strigitarsis   (Tadzhikistan)
 P. subcostatus   (China, Mongolia, and Russia)
 P. subcylindricus   (Afghanistan and Turkmenistan)
 P. substriatus   (Kyrgyzstan, Tadzhikistan, and Uzbekistan)
 P. susterai   (Kyrgyzstan)
 P. tarantsha   (China)
 P. taschkensis   (Uzbekistan)
 P. thibetanus   (China)
 P. thoracicus   (Azerbaijan, Kazakhstan, Kyrgyzstan, and Uzbekistan)
 P. tianshanicus   (China and Kyrgyzstan)
 P. tomskoensis   (Russia)
 P. vereschaginae   (Kyrgyzstan)
 P. wrasei   (Kazakhstan)
 P. xiahensis   (China)
 P. yunnanus   (China)
 P. yupeiyui   (China)
 P. znojkoi   (Kazakhstan)
 P. zvarici   (China)

References

Platyninae